The Rotterdam University of Applied Sciences  (abbreviated as Rotterdam UAS) is located in the city of Rotterdam, Netherlands. It was created in 1988 by a large-scale merger of 19 higher education schools followed by a merger with the Hogeschool voor Economische Studies. It teaches at ten campuses in Rotterdam and one in the nearby city of Dordrecht. Its current  student body is greater than 30,000.

References

External links
  
Rotterdam University of Applied Sciences
Hogeschool Rotterdam
The Rotterdam Academy of Architecture and Urban Design
Team Phidippides official website

Vocational universities in the Netherlands
Education in Rotterdam
Educational institutions established in 1988
1988 establishments in the Netherlands